Hectaphelia periculosa is a species of moth of the family Tortricidae. It is found in South Africa.

The wingspan is about 15 mm. The ground colour of the forewings is whitish with ochreous cream suffusions along the costa, the dorsum, the median area and the terminal third of the wing. The hindwings are cream, but whiter basally.

Etymology
The species name refers to the large parts of the genitalia and is derived from Latin periculosa (meaning dangerous).

References

Endemic moths of South Africa
Moths described in 2006
Archipini